Li Mo (born 21 January 1990 in Jinan, Shandong) is a Chinese swimmer, who competed for Team China at the 2008 Summer Olympics.

Major achievements
2002 Asian Games - 1st 50 m/100 m free
2002 Asian Games - 1st 50 m back
2005 National Games - 2nd 400 m free, 3rd 800 m free
2006 Asian Championships - 2nd 400 m/800 m free

References
http://2008teamchina.olympic.cn/index.php/personview/personsen/780

External links

1990 births
Living people
Olympic swimmers of China
Sportspeople from Jinan
Swimmers at the 2008 Summer Olympics
Swimmers from Shandong
Swimmers at the 2006 Asian Games
Asian Games competitors for China
Chinese female freestyle swimmers
Chinese female backstroke swimmers
20th-century Chinese women
21st-century Chinese women